Aleksandr Vladimirovich Davydov (born 12 May 1977) is a former Russian football goalkeeper.

Club career
He played in the Russian Football National League for FC Avangard Kursk in 2005.

External links
 
 Career summary by sportbox.ru
 

1977 births
Living people
Russian footballers
Association football goalkeepers
FC Avangard Kursk players